Crufts is an international dog show held annually in the United Kingdom, first held in 1891. Organised and hosted by The Kennel Club, it is the largest show of its kind in the world.

Crufts is centred on a championship conformation show for dogs, and includes a large trade show of mainly dog-related goods and services, as well as competitions in dog agility, obedience, flyball and heelwork to music. Winner of the annual Friends for Life competition which celebrates unsung canine heroes is also announced at Crufts and it hosts finals of Scruffts, a crossbreed competition. It is held over four days (Thursday to Sunday) in early March at the National Exhibition Centre (NEC) in Solihull, England.

Crufts consists of several competitions occurring at the same time. The main competition is for the Best in Show award, which is hotly contested by dogs and their owners throughout the world.

The Kennel Club was criticised on the BBC programme Pedigree Dogs Exposed for allowing breed standards, judging standards and breeding practices which are said to compromise the health of purebred dogs. The programme led various sponsors to withdraw. The BBC dropped Crufts 2009 from their coverage after being unable to agree to terms with The Kennel Club, with Channel 4 broadcasting the event since 2010.

History

Crufts was named after its founder, Charles Cruft, who worked as general manager for a dog biscuit manufacturer, travelling to dog shows both in the United Kingdom and internationally, which allowed him to establish contacts and understand the need for higher standards for dog shows. In 1886, Cruft's first dog show, billed as the "First Great Terrier Show", had 57 classes and 600 entries. The first show named "Crufts"—"Cruft's Greatest Dog Show"—was held at the Royal Agricultural Hall, Islington, in 1891. It was the first at which all breeds were invited to compete, with around 2,000 dogs and almost 2,500 entries.

With the close of the 19th century, entries had risen to over 3,000, including royal patronage from various European countries and Russia. Due to the First World War, the show was not held between 1918 and 1920. In 1928, the Best In Show class was introduced and awarded to a Greyhound named Primley Sceptre, shown by Herbert Whitley, the founder of what is now Paignton Zoo. The show continued annually and gained popularity each year until Charles' death in 1938. His widow ran the show for four years until she felt unable to do so due to its high demands of time and effort. To ensure the future and reputation of the show (and, of course, her husband's work), she sold it to The Kennel Club in 1942.

In 1936, "The Jubilee Show" had 10,650 entries with the number of breeds totalling 80. The show was again interrupted by the Second World War therefore the 1948 show was the first to be held under the new owner and was held at Olympia in London, where it continued to gain popularity with each passing year. The BBC first televised the show in 1950. The 1954 competition was cancelled due to an electricians' strike. In 1959, despite an increase in entrance fees, the show set a new world record with 13,211 entrants.

The first Obedience Championships were held in 1955, the same year working sheepdogs were first allowed to enter. In 1978, agility was introduced as a demonstration, to later become a competition in 1980, with an international invitational competition added in 2001. In 1985, the Young Kennel Club was founded to promote dog handling among younger people. Flyball was introduced in 1990, and in 1992, the first Heelwork to Music demonstration was carried out by Mary Ray. Since early 90s, the Kennel Club also started to campaign for responsible dog ownership with emphasis on choosing the right dog for you and introduced Discover Dogs area to Crufts, where visitors can meet all currently recognised breeds and chat to breed experts about dog ownership. In 2000, Rescue Dog Agility was added to the programme.  

By 1979, the show had to be moved to Earls Court exhibition centre as the increasing number of entries and spectators had outgrown the capacity of its previous venue. Soon, the show had to be changed again – the duration had to be increased to three days in 1982, then again in 1987 to four days as the popularity continued to increase. Since 1991, the show has been held in the National Exhibition Centre, Solihull, the first time the show had moved out of London since its inception.

It was also at the Centenary celebrations in 1991 that Crufts was officially recognised by the Guinness Book of Records as the world's largest dog show with 22,973 dogs being exhibited in conformation classes that year. Including agility and other events, it is estimated that an average 28,000 dogs take part in Crufts each year, with an estimated 160,000 human visitors attending the show.

Crufts was formerly televised by the BBC; this ended after the 2008 event (see "Criticism") and the 2009 event was only shown via the Internet. Since 2010 the show has been broadcast on the commercial channels Channel 4 and More4, attracting over 4.5 million viewers.

In 2021, as a result of the COVID-19 pandemic, Crufts was postponed and scheduled to take place in July, as opposed to March as usual, however the show was later cancelled for the first time since the electricians’ strike of 1954.

The 2022 edition took place 10–13 March 2022.

The 2023 edition is scheduled to take place 9–12 March 2023.

Competing for Best in Show
Crufts is not an open competition; dogs must have qualified throughout the previous year. There are a number of ways of qualifying for the breed classes at Crufts, but most dogs typically qualify by obtaining first, second or third place in the relevant class at a Kennel Club affiliated Championship show where Challenge Certificates are awarded, or by achieving Best in Show, Reserve Best in Show or Best Puppy in Show at a Kennel Club affiliated Open or General show. Dogs can become qualified for life upon attaining their Kennel Club Stud Book Number.

Dogs compete in hierarchical fashion. Dogs begin by competing against others of the same breed, split by gender, age and previous class wins. These classes include Veteran, Special Puppy, Special Junior, Yearling, Post Graduate, Mid Limit, Limit, and Open. Each is awarded once for dogs and once for bitches. The dog and bitch class winners then compete again for the Dog and Bitch Challenge Certificate (CC). The two CC winners then go head-to-head to determine the Best of Breed.

After the best of each breed has been chosen, they then compete against the others in their Group (in the UK, there are seven Groups: Toys, Gundogs, Utility, Hounds, Working, Pastoral, and Terriers) to find the Best in Group. The seven Group winners then compete to find the Best in Show and Reserve Best in Show.

Best in Show winners receive a replica of the solid silver Keddall Memorial Trophy, and a small cash prize of £100.

The English Cocker Spaniel is the most successful breed at Crufts, having been awarded Best In Show seven times, and the Gundog Group is the most successful group, having produced 23 Best In Show winners.

Best in Show winners (since 2006)

Other competitions 
Crufts hosts range of other competitions, including agility, obedience and flyball.

Agility is a fast-paced  timed competition in which dogs manoeuvre, with the guidance of their owners, through, over, and around different obstacles. Any mistake made by the dog is penalised by adding time to their result. Dogs must qualify during the preceding year to compete in individual or team events, although representative handlers and dogs from England, Wales, Scotland, Northern Ireland and the Republic of Ireland are invited to compete in the International competitions.

Obedience, held in the ‘Obedience Ring’ requires dogs to successfully obey set of commands given by their owners including off lead heelwork at different paces, distance control, retrieve, send away, stays and scent discrimination. Dogs qualify by being successful at shows during the preceding year to compete in the Dog and Bitch UK Obedience Championships, UK Inter-Regional Team Competition and the crowd's favourite, the Obedience World Cup. The prizes are awarded to the most obedient dog according to the judges. Obreedience is a group version of the activity in which team of four dogs of the same breed compete against other teams in being most obedient.

Flyball is a relay-style race. Teams of four dogs compete against each other in a knock-out competition. Each dog jumps a series of four hurdles, and then steps on a box, which is rigged to release a ball. The dog must then return the ball to the start of the course to tag one of its team, who then repeats this process until all the dogs have finished. Teams must qualify during the preceding year.

Crufts also hold both freestyle and heelwork to music competitions, consisting of a choreographed routine, comprising elements of obedience, set to music.

The gamekeepers classes at Crufts focus on judging the suitability of field-bred dogs for use in the field. Dogs entered are of the gundog group, but the conformation of these dogs differs significantly from that of gundogs from show-bred bloodlines, owing to the need for function as a working gundog, and they are judged accordingly.

The Young Kennel Club (YKC) also has its own ring and stand where handlers aged between 6 and 25 compete in Agility, Obedience, Showing, Handling, Heelwork to Music, Flyball, and Grooming. Handlers and dogs must qualify in their discipline during the preceding year.

Crufts hosts the World Champion Junior Handling competition in which National Best Junior Handler winners from around the globe compete for this esteemed title. Since there is a quarantine to the import of foreign dogs, many competitors must "borrow" dogs from gracious British show enthusiasts. The first World title competition, held in 1984, was judged by Ger Pederson. The winner of this premiere competition was US representative Tracie Laliberte who had won Westminster Kennel Club in 1983. A unique feature of this first competition was the requirement of switching dogs mid-way through the competition.

Other attractions 
Crufts regularly attracts over 160,000 visitors to the NEC and more than 155,000 people visited Crufts in 2020. While the main purpose of the event is the search for the best dog in the show, many trade stands sell a wide range of dog-related merchandise or advertise dog-related charities. Many exhibitors include interactive displays in their stands and demonstration of their product and work, i.e. demonstration of canine first aid.

There is also a section known as Discover Dogs where visitors can see almost every breed recognised by the Kennel Club on view, and discuss each breed with knowledgeable owners.

Crufts also holds special shows and demonstrations, where specially trained dogs perform in front of an arena audience, including Police Dogs, Royal Airforce Dogs and Medical Detection Dogs.

Crossbreeds
As the Kennel Club also registers crossbreeds, Crufts also hosts many competitions and displays for crossbreeds. They mainly compete in agility, obedience and heelwork to music competitions. The popularity of Crufts and the interest of dog owners who do not own purebreeds convinced the Kennel Club to hold Scruffts, a show similar to Crufts for crossbreed dogs. Scruffts regularly attracts hundreds of entries and dozens of finalists compete for the top prize in a final at Crufts.

Criticism 

The Kennel Club was criticised on the August 2008 BBC programme Pedigree Dogs Exposed for allowing breed standards, judging standards and breeding practices which are said to compromise the health of purebred dogs.  The programme led various sponsors such as Hill's Pet Nutrition, Royal Society for the Prevention of Cruelty to Animals and Dogs Trust to withdraw their participation in Crufts and other Kennel Club events. The RSPCA stated that it is "concerned about the unacceptably high levels of disability, deformity and disease affecting pedigree dogs". The BBC dropped Crufts 2009 from their coverage after being unable to agree to terms with the Kennel Club. It was reported that Pedigree Petfoods withdrew from sponsorship of Crufts following this programme, but their announcement was made well in advance of the broadcast and for financial reasons.  Kennel Club Chairman Ronnie Irving said that "If this programme teaches us anything, I hope it will teach the 'purists' in some breeds that they simply must get a move on and realise that in these politically correct and well informed days, some old attitudes are simply no longer sustainable." Maintaining that the majority of dogs are healthy he said that "the roughly 90% of us who thankfully have healthy breeds must continue to guard against exaggeration and must bring pressure to bear on the laggards, otherwise we will – all of us – continue to be tarred with the same brush".
The Kennel Club initially defended their practices, and criticised the programme as "highly biased". It also lodged a complaint to regulatory authority Ofcom claiming "unfair treatment and editing".

The Kennel Club have introduced new health plan, breed standards for every breed went under review, and show judges would be required to choose only healthy dogs. It has also requested regulatory powers from the Government, which would allow the club to take actions against breeders who do not comply with health standards. New breed standards for 209 dog breeds were announced in January 2009, and became effective immediately, but with breeders allowed until June to object.  The new standards were said to "not include anything that could in any way be interpreted as encouraging features that might prevent a dog from breathing, walking and seeing freely." "This will help to prevent the practice of exaggeration, where features that are perceived to be desirable, such as a short muzzle or loose skin, are made more prominent by breeders, and which can have detrimental effects on a dog’s health."

RSPCA report
In February 2009, the results of an independent scientific report commissioned by the RSPCA concluded that "exaggerated physical features and inherited diseases cause serious welfare problems in pedigree dogs". Quoting Arman (2007), the report states that "Society and sections of the veterinary profession have become 'desensitised to the welfare issues to such an extent that the production of anatomically deformed dogs is neither shocking, nor considered abnormal'". It also states that "Breeding practices and efforts by breed societies and kennel clubs, to date, have been ineffective at protecting the welfare of many breeds of domestic dog" and that "changes in breeding and selection practices are urgently required". The Kennel Club states that the report "fails totally to recognise the real steady progress and advance of scientific knowledge that has already been made in the area of pedigree dog health."

In culture
Poppy Holman's play A Dog's Tale, based on Crufts, was commissioned as one of Mikron Theatre Company's two 2020 productions, was delayed by COVID-19, and premiered in Leeds on 5 June 2021.

See also 
 Breed groups (dog)
 Catwalk Dogs
 Cultural icon
 List of cultural icons of England
 Supreme Cat Show
 World Dog Show

References

External links 

Crufts YouTube channel

 
1886 establishments in the United Kingdom
British culture
Crufts (dog show)
Dogs in the United Kingdom
Annual events in England
Recurring events established in 1896